Paul Hermann August Oestreich (30 March 1878 – 28 February 1959) was a German educator and pedagogue.

Early life

Oestreich was born in Kolberg, within the German Empire's Prussian Province of Pomerania. He studied mathematics, philosophy, pedagogy, and new languages at the universities of Berlin and Greifswald from 1896-1900.

Career
In Berlin-Schöneberg, Oestreich was a teacher from 1901 and a Studienrat from 1905.
He joined the National-Social Association and the Liberals Association to Friedrich Naumann, which he represented 1906-08 in the Berlin City Council, then the Democratic Union. He became a member of the "Federal New Fatherland", and later, in 1921-1926  he was a board member of the "German Peace Society". From 1918 till 1931 he was a member of the SPD.

In 1919, Oestreich founded the Bund Entschiedener Schulreformer (BESch) and led it until 1933. After the Second World War, Oestirch joined the Communist Party of Germany and later the Socialist Unity Party.

From 1945-1949, Oestreich was Hauptschulrat in Berlin-Zehlendorf. From 1949 to 1950 he worked in the Hauptschulamt of the Magistrat of Groß-Berlin Dezernent for higher education. In 1949 he became a head of the 29 higher schools in east Berlin.

In autumn of 1954 he received the award "Verdienter Lehrer des Volkes" by the Soviet Council of Ministers.

Paul-Oestreich-Straße is a street named after Oestreich in Berlin-Weißensee.

Literary works 
 An editor of the "Neue Erziehung" (bulletin of the Bund Entschiedener Schulreformer)
 Die Produktionsschule, 1920
 Die Einheitsschule als Schule d. Menschenbildung, 1920; 
 Die elastische Einheitsschule, 1921
 Die Produktionsschule als Nothaus u. Neubau, 1924; 
 Der neue Lehrer, 1926 (with O. Tacke); 
 Erziehung zur Liebe, 1930 (with E. Dehmel); 
 Der Einbruch d. Technik in d. Pädagogik, 1930; 
 Hat dieser Wettbewerb einen Sinn, 1931 (with A. Horschitz)
 Die Technik als Luzifer der Pädagogik, 1947
 Die Schule zur Volkskultur, 1947

See also
 List of peace activists

References

External links 
 Paul-Oestreich-Straße 

1878 births
1959 deaths
People from Kołobrzeg
German academic administrators
People from the Province of Pomerania
University of Greifswald alumni